Fanny Janauschek (born Francesca Romana Magdalena Janauschek; July 20, 1829 – November 28, 1904) was a Czech-born American stage actress.

Biography
Francesca Romana Magdalena Janauschek was born on July 20, 1829 in Prague. Her mother worked as a theatre laundress and her father as a tailor.

She came to the United States in 1867 and first performed at the Academy of Music in New York City, on October 9, 1867, managed by Max Maretzek. She spoke no English, only German and often worked with all English speaking casts. 

In three years time since arriving in the U.S. she mastered enough English dialect to communicate with American audiences and decided to make America her home. Some of her performances, especially Medea, were compared to the revered Italian tragedienne Adelaide Ristori. She became famous acting in great Shakespearean parts and other famous parts. She was particularly noted for playing Meg Merrilies, a role Charlotte Cushman made famous. In 1873, Janauschek starred in an adaptation of Charles Dickens's Bleak House, in which she played both the heroine Lady Dedlock and the murderous Mademoiselle Hortense. 

She played this double role in touring companies for decades. In 1900, Janauschek had a stroke and was paralyzed. She died in 1904, partially blind and bankrupt. Friends and actors gathered a collection to have her buried properly in Evergreen Cemetery, New York City. Janauschek had no known offspring.

References

External links

 
 Francheska Janauschek portrait gallery at NY Public Library Billy Rose Collection(updated url March 2017)
 Fanny Janauschek at JosephHaworth.com

1829 births
1904 deaths
Actresses from Prague
Austro-Hungarian emigrants to the United States
American people of Bohemian descent
American Shakespearean actresses
19th-century American actresses
American stage actresses